Song Yoo-hyun (Korean:송유현; born Song Jin-young on 8 January 1983) is a South Korean actress. She is alumni of Korea National University of Arts, Department of Acting. She made her acting debut in 2001, since then, she has appeared in number of films and television series. She is known for her role as Han Go-eun, a cynical boss in Hell Is Other People (2019) and 18 Again (2020). She has acted in films as: Mate (2019)  and Midnight (2021) among others. In 2020 she appeared in TV series Born Again and in 2021 she is appearing in TV series Now, We Are Breaking Up.

Career
Song Yoo-hyun is a Bachelor Arts in Acting from Korea National University of Arts. She made her theater debut in the play The Shape in 2008. She appeared in films as Confession (2014), Alone (2015), Don't Hurt, and TV series 'Signal (2016), The Good Wife (2016), Mother (2018), Confession (2019), Designated Survivor: 60 Days (2019), Welcome 2 Life (2019). She is affiliated to WS Entertainment since October 2019.

In 2020, Song appeared in 18 Again and Born Again. In 2021, she is appearing in SBS TV series Now, We Are Breaking Up as Oh In-ah.

Filmography

Films

Television series

Theater

References

External links

 
 Song Yoo-hyun on Daum 

21st-century South Korean actresses
South Korean film actresses
South Korean television actresses
Living people
1983 births
Korea National University of Arts alumni